Astictopterus inornatus, the modest sylph, is a species of butterfly in the family Hesperiidae. It is found in South Africa in Afromontane forests from the East Cape, east along the Drakensberg foothills to the KwaZulu-Natal midlands and the coastal forests and rivers.

The wingspan is 24–29 mm for males and 27–29 mm for females. Adults are on wing from September to April (with a peak in January). There are multiple generations per year.

The larvae feed on Imperata cylindrica and Imperata arundinacea.

References

Butterflies described in 1864
Astictopterini
Butterflies of Africa
Taxa named by Roland Trimen